Kalateh-ye Khan or Kalateh Khan may refer to:
 Amirabad-e Pain (disambiguation)
 Ebrahimabad, Ferdows
 Kalateh-ye Khan, Nehbandan
 Kalateh-ye Khan, Qaen
 Kalateh-ye Khan, Razavi Khorasan
 Kalateh-ye Khan, Semnan
 Rahmatabad, Gonabad
 Kalateh-ye Hamid